Rite Now is the eighteenth solo album by Julian Cope, released in 2002. It is also the third album in the Rite series following the earlier albums Rite (1992) and Rite² (1997).

Mostly instrumental, the album features four "meditational funk-a-thons", as Cope's website describes them, combining funky grooves and krautrock rhythms with wah-wah guitars and "cosmic" synthesizers.

Track listing

Personnel
Credits adapted from the album's liner notes.

Musicians
Julian Cope – bass, guitar, Mellotron 400, percussion, vocals
Anthony "Doggen" Foster – guitar (also performs pseudonymously as "Terry Dobbin" playing guitar and percussion) 
Thighpaulsandra – ARP 2600, Korg organ, Faerial 5 (also performs pseudonymously as "Cliff Cheerio" playing Hammond organ, percussion and Roland 77)
Donald Ross Skinner – percussion, harmonica, organ, bass on "Ephaedra"
Kevin "Kevlar" Bales – drums
Adam Whittaker – digital, cassettes
John-Paul Braddock – digital, crystal machine
Technical
Julian Cope – producer, directed by, photography, design
Flora Cocktail – design

References

External links
 Rite Now on Discogs.com. Retrieved on 27 April 2018.

2002 albums
Julian Cope albums